Argyrodes, also called dewdrop spiders, is a genus of comb-footed spiders that was first described by Eugène Louis Simon in 1864. They occur worldwide, and are best known for their kleptoparasitism. They can spin their own webs, but tend to invade and reside in their hosts' webs. This relationship can be commensal or even mutual if the dewdrop spider feeds on small trapped insects that are not eaten by the host. Some species can even prey upon the host.

{{Automatic taxobox
| taxon = Argyrodes
| name = Dewdrop spiders
| image = Argyrodes Kaldari 01.jpg
| fossil_range = 
| authority = Simon, 1864
| type_species = A. argyrodes
| type_species_authority = (Walckenaer, 1841)
| subdivision_ranks = Species
| subdivision = 93, see text
| synonyms = *Argyrodina Strand, 1926
Conopistha Karsch, 1881
Microcephalus Restrepo, 1944<ref name=Levi1972>{{cite journal| last=Levi| first=H. W.| year=1972| title=Taxonomic-nomenclatural notes on misplaced theridiid spiders (Araneae: Theridiidae), with observations on Anelosimus| journal=Transactions of the American Microscopical Society| volume=91| page=534}}</ref>
| synonyms_ref = 
}}The genus name is a combination of the Ancient Greek "argyros", meaning "silver", and the suffix "-odes", meaning "like".

 Description 
Most species are relatively small, and many are black with silvery markings. The body has a characteristic conical or triangle shape with a shorter third pair of legs, common in web dwelling spiders. The silver coloration of Argyrodes may be able to attract moths and other insects as it stimulates their photoreceptors and may resemble starlight.

Distribution
Most Argyrodes are found in the tropics, though fifteen species are found in the United States. A. elevatus is found in the southern US, A. nephilae in Florida and A. pluto in Maryland, Virginia, and Missouri. The latter species has been reported as far south as Chihuahua and Jamaica as well.

 Behavior Argyrodes are kleptoparasitic spiders that live on the webs created by orb-weaver spiders. These spiders feed on the small prey items caught in the host webs that they parasitize. In some instances, Argyrodes may even feed on previously digested carcasses that remain on the web. While these spiders are well known for being kleptoparasitic, they are also arachnophagous, meaning they prey on other spiders. Argyrodes will wait for a time when the host spider is vulnerable, such as during molting, and will attack and feed on it. This is true for the host spider's offspring as well, however Agyrodes will only feed on other spiders in some instances.

It has been suggested that Argyrodes may have a mutualistic relationship with the host. The silver coloration of Argyrodes was found to attract more prey, particularly moths, to the host's web. This allows for larger prey items to be attracted for the host spider while Argyrodes is able to consume the smaller unwanted prey. A common misconception about Argyrodes is that it steals prey from the host spider, but recent research has showed that Argyrodes rarely steals large prey items from the host, and only eats what the host spider typically does not want. They have been noticed in complex Joro spider webs, for example.

Kleptoparasitic spiders such as Argyrodes tend to prefer larger host webs over small ones, and multiple spiders often inhabit the same host web. Clustered webs were found to be preferred by Arygrodes, but only because these webs are generally larger than isolated ones. There does not appear to be any preference for clustered webs over isolated webs when comparing the number of spiders per web area. Kleptoparasitic spiders tend to spend much of their time on the outskirts of the host web, using this area as a safe place outside of the host spiders typical monitoring range. In addition to stealing food from the host web, dewdrop spiders are also known to use the host web as a location for mating as well as a place to hang their egg sacs.

Species
 it contains ninety-three species and five subspecies, found in Asia, South America, North America, Oceania, Africa, the Caribbean, on the Canary Islands, and Saint Helena:A. abscissus O. Pickard-Cambridge, 1880 – MadagascarA. alannae Grostal, 1999 – Eastern AustraliaA. ambalikae Tikader, 1970 – IndiaA. amboinensis Thorell, 1878 – Indonesia (Sulawesi, Ambon), New Guinea, New CaledoniaA. antipodianus O. Pickard-Cambridge, 1880 – Australia, New Caledonia, New ZealandA. apiculatus Thorell, 1895 – MyanmarA. argentatus O. Pickard-Cambridge, 1880 – India, Indonesia to China. Introduced to HawaiiA. argyrodes (Walckenaer, 1841) (type) – Mediterranean to West Africa, SeychellesA. atriapicatus Strand, 1906 – EthiopiaA. bandanus Strand, 1911 – Indonesia (Banda Is.)A. benedicti Lopez, 1988 – French GuianaA. binotatus Rainbow, 1915 – AustraliaA. bonadea (Karsch, 1881) – India, China, Korea, Taiwan, Japan, PhilippinesA. borbonicus Lopez, 1990 – RéunionA. callipygus Thorell, 1895 – MyanmarA. calmettei Lopez, 1990 – RéunionA. chionus Roberts, 1983 – Seychelles (Aldabra)A. chiriatapuensis Tikader, 1977 – India (Andaman Is.)A. chounguii Lopez, 2010 – MayotteA. coactatus Lopez, 1988 – French GuianaA. cognatus (Blackwall, 1877) – SeychellesA. convivans Lawrence, 1937 – South AfricaA. cylindratus Thorell, 1898 – China, Myanmar to JapanA. cyrtophorae Tikader, 1963 – IndiaA. delicatulus Thorell, 1878 – Indonesia (Ambon)A. dipali Tikader, 1963 – IndiaA. elevatus Taczanowski, 1873 – USA to Argentina, Galapagos Is.A. exlineae (Caporiacco, 1949) – KenyaA. fasciatus Thorell, 1892 – Malaysia, SingaporeA. fissifrons O. Pickard-Cambridge, 1869 – Sri Lanka to Indonesia, Papua New Guinea, China, Australia (Queensland)Argyrodes f. terressae Thorell, 1891 – India (Nicobar Is.)A. fissifrontellus Saaristo, 1978 – SeychellesA. flavescens O. Pickard-Cambridge, 1880 – India, Sri Lanka to Japan, New GuineaA. flavipes Rainbow, 1916 – Australia (Queensland)A. fragilis Thorell, 1877 – Indonesia (Sulawesi)A. gazedes Tikader, 1970 – IndiaA. gazingensis Tikader, 1970 – IndiaA. gemmatus Rainbow, 1920 – Australia (Lord Howe Is.)A. gouri Tikader, 1963 – IndiaA. gracilis (L. Koch, 1872) – Australia (Lord Howe Is.), New Caledonia, SamoaA. hawaiiensis Simon, 1900 – HawaiiA. ilipoepoe Rivera & Gillespie, 2010 – HawaiiA. incertus Wunderlich, 1987 – Canary Is.A. incisifrons Keyserling, 1890 – Australia (Queensland)A. incursus Gray & Anderson, 1989 – Australia (New South Wales, Lord Howe Is.)A. insectus Schmidt, 2005 – Cape Verde Is.A. jamkhedes Tikader, 1963 – IndiaA. kratochvili (Caporiacco, 1949) – KenyaA. kualensis Hogg, 1927 – MalaysiaA. kulczynskii (Roewer, 1942) – New GuineaA. kumadai Chida & Tanikawa, 1999 – China, Taiwan, JapanA. laja Rivera & Gillespie, 2010 – HawaiiA. lanyuensis Yoshida, Tso & Severinghaus, 1998 – TaiwanA. latifolium Liu, Irfan & Peng, 2019 – ChinaA. lepidus O. Pickard-Cambridge, 1880 – New ZealandA. levuca Strand, 1915 – FijiA. lucmae Chamberlin, 1916 – PeruA. maculiger Strand, 1911 – Indonesia (Kei Is.)A. margaritarius (Rainbow, 1894) – Australia (New South Wales)A. mellissi (O. Pickard-Cambridge, 1870) – St. HelenaA. mertoni Strand, 1911 – Indonesia (Aru Is.)Argyrodes m. poecilior Strand, 1913 – Central AfricaA. miltosus Zhu & Song, 1991 – ChinaA. minax O. Pickard-Cambridge, 1880 – Madagascar, ComorosA. miniaceus (Doleschall, 1857) – Korea, Japan to AustraliaA. modestus Thorell, 1899 – CameroonA. nasutus O. Pickard-Cambridge, 1880 – Sri LankaA. neocaledonicus Berland, 1924 – New CaledoniaA. nephilae Taczanowski, 1873 – USA, Caribbean to Argentina, Galapagos Is. Introduced to IndiaA. parcestellatus Simon, 1909 – VietnamA. pluto Banks, 1906 – USA, Mexico, JamaicaA. praeacutus Simon, 1903 – Equatorial GuineaA. projeles Tikader, 1970 – IndiaA. rainbowi (Roewer, 1942) – Australia (Queensland, New South Wales)A. reticola Strand, 1911 – Indonesia (Aru Is.)A. rostratus Blackwall, 1877 – SeychellesA. samoensis O. Pickard-Cambridge, 1880 – New Caledonia, SamoaA. scapulatus Schmidt & Piepho, 1994 – Cape Verde Is.A. scintillulanus O. Pickard-Cambridge, 1880 – India, Sri LankaA. sextuberculosus Strand, 1908 – Mozambique, MadagascarArgyrodes s. dilutior (Caporiacco, 1940) – EthiopiaA. strandi (Caporiacco, 1940) – EthiopiaA. stridulator Lawrence, 1937 – South AfricaA. sublimis L. Koch, 1872 – FijiA. sundaicus (Doleschall, 1859) – Thailand, Indonesia (Java), Papua New Guinea (New Britain)A. tenuis Thorell, 1877 – Indonesia (Sulawesi)Argyrodes t. infumatus Thorell, 1878 – Indonesia (Ambon)A. tripunctatus Simon, 1877 – PhilippinesA. unimaculatus (Marples, 1955) – Samoa, Tongatabu, NiueA. vatovae (Caporiacco, 1940) – EthiopiaA. viridis (Vinson, 1863) – Madagascar, RéunionA. vittatus Bradley, 1877 – New GuineaA. weyrauchi Exline & Levi, 1962 – PeruA. wolfi Strand, 1911 – New GuineaA. yunnanensis Xu, Yin & Kim, 2000 – ChinaA. zhui Zhu & Song, 1991 – ChinaA. zonatus (Walckenaer, 1841) – Equatorial Guinea (Bioko), East Africa, Madagascar, Réunion, MayotteArgyrodes z. occidentalis Simon, 1903 – Guinea-Bissau

Formerly included:A. aculeatus (Thorell, 1898) (Transferred to Rhomphaea)A. acuminatus Keyserling, 1891 (Transferred to Faiditus)A. acuminatus (Schenkel, 1953) (Transferred to Chrysso)A. affinis (Lessert, 1936) (Transferred to Rhomphaea)A. alticeps Keyserling, 1891 (Transferred to Faiditus)A. altus Keyserling, 1891 (Transferred to Faiditus)A. amates Exline & Levi, 1962 (Transferred to Faiditus)A. americanus (Taczanowski, 1874) (Transferred to Faiditus)A. analiae González & Carmen, 1996 (Transferred to Faiditus)A. andamanensis Tikader, 1977 (Transferred to Meotipa)A. angulipalpis (Thorell, 1877) (Transferred to Rhomphaea)A. anomalus (Chamberlin & Ivie, 1936) (Transferred to Synotaxus)A. argenteolus (Simon, 1873) (Transferred to Rhomphaea)A. argentiopunctatus Rainbow, 1916 (Transferred to Thwaitesia)A. argyrodiformis (Yaginuma, 1952) (Transferred to Meotipa)A. arthuri Exline & Levi, 1962 (Transferred to Faiditus)A. atopus Chamberlin & Ivie, 1936 (Transferred to Faiditus)A. baboquivari Exline & Levi, 1962 (Transferred to Neospintharus)A. barycephalus Roberts, 1983 (Transferred to Rhomphaea)A. birgitae (Strand, 1917) (Transferred to Ariamnes)A. bryantae Exline & Levi, 1962 (Transferred to Faiditus)A. campestratus (Simon, 1903) (Transferred to Ariamnes)A. canariensis (Schmidt, 1956) (Transferred to Rhomphaea)A. cancellatus (Hentz, 1850) (Transferred to Faiditus)A. carnicobarensis Tikader, 1977 (Transferred to Faiditus)A. caronae González & Carmen, 1996 (Transferred to Faiditus)A. caudatus (Taczanowski, 1874) (Transferred to Faiditus)A. ceraosus Zhu & Song, 1991 (Transferred to Rhomphaea)A. chicaensis González & Carmen, 1996 (Transferred to Faiditus)A. chickeringi Exline & Levi, 1962 (Transferred to Faiditus)A. cochleaformus (Exline, 1945) (Transferred to Faiditus)A. colubrinus (Keyserling, 1890) (Transferred to Ariamnes)A. cometes (L. Koch, 1872) (Transferred to Rhomphaea)A. concisus Exline & Levi, 1962 (Transferred to Neospintharus)A. conus González & Carmen, 1996 (Transferred to Rhomphaea)A. convolutus Exline & Levi, 1962 (Transferred to Faiditus)A. cordillera (Exline, 1945) (Transferred to Faiditus)A. corniger (Simon, 1900) (Transferred to Ariamnes)A. cristinae González & Carmen, 1996 (Transferred to Faiditus)A. crucinotus Bösenberg & Strand, 1906 (Transferred to Leucauge)A. cubensis Exline & Levi, 1962 (Transferred to Faiditus)A. cylindricus Franganillo, 1936 (Transferred to Faiditus)A. cylindrogaster (Simon, 1889) (Transferred to Ariamnes)A. darlingtoni Exline & Levi, 1962 (Transferred to Faiditus)A. davisi Exline & Levi, 1962 (Transferred to Faiditus)A. delicatulus (Simon, 1883) (Transferred to Rhomphaea)A. dracus Chamberlin & Ivie, 1936 (Transferred to Faiditus)A. duckensis González & Carmen, 1996 (Transferred to Faiditus)A. ecaudatus (Keyserling, 1884) (Transferred to Faiditus)A. exiguus Exline & Levi, 1962 (Transferred to Faiditus)A. fictilium (Hentz, 1850) (Transferred to Rhomphaea)A. flagellum (Doleschall, 1857) (Transferred to Ariamnes)A. flagellum (Simon, 1901) (Transferred to Ariamnes)A. flavonotatus (Urquhart, 1890) (Transferred to Tekelloides)A. floridanus Banks, 1900 (Transferred to Coleosoma)A. frontatus Banks, 1908 (Transferred to Neospintharus)A. fulvus Exline & Levi, 1962 (Transferred to Faiditus)A. fur Bösenberg & Strand, 1906 (Transferred to Neospintharus)A. gansuensis Zhu, 1998 (Transferred to Neospintharus)A. gapensis Exline & Levi, 1962 (Transferred to Faiditus)A. gertschi Exline & Levi, 1962 (Transferred to Faiditus)A. globosus Keyserling, 1884 (Transferred to Faiditus)A. godmani Exline & Levi, 1962 (Transferred to Faiditus)A. haitensis Exline & Levi, 1962 (Transferred to Ariamnes)A. helminthoides (Simon, 1907) (Transferred to Ariamnes)A. huangsangensis Yin, Peng & Bao, 2004 (Transferred to Spheropistha)A. hyrcanus Logunov & Marusik, 1990 (Transferred to Rhomphaea)A. iguazuensis González & Carmen, 1996 (Transferred to Faiditus)A. indignus Chamberlin & Ivie, 1936 (Transferred to Faiditus)A. irroratus (Thorell, 1898) (Transferred to Rhomphaea)A. jamaicensis Exline & Levi, 1962 (Transferred to Faiditus)A. jeanneli (Berland, 1920) (Transferred to Ariamnes)A. labiatus Zhu & Song, 1991 (Transferred to Rhomphaea)A. lactifer (Simon, 1909) (Transferred to Rhomphaea)A. laraensis González & Carmen, 1996 (Transferred to Faiditus)A. leonensis Exline & Levi, 1962 (Transferred to Faiditus)A. levii Zhu & Song, 1991 (Transferred to Faiditus)A. longispinus Saito, 1933 (Transferred to Cyclosa)A. longissimus (Keyserling, 1891) (Transferred to Ariamnes)A. longus (Kulczyński, 1905) (Transferred to Rhomphaea)A. manta (Exline, 1945) (Transferred to Faiditus)A. mariae González & Carmen, 1996 (Transferred to Faiditus)A. martinae (Exline, 1950) (Transferred to Rhomphaea)A. melanosoma (Yaginuma, 1957) (Transferred to Spheropistha)A. metaltissimus (Soares & Camargo, 1948) (Transferred to Rhomphaea)A. mexicanus Exline & Levi, 1962 (Transferred to Ariamnes)A. miyashitai Tanikawa, 1998 (Transferred to Spheropistha)A. monoceros (Caporiacco, 1947) (Transferred to Synotaxus)A. montanus Keyserling, 1884 (Transferred to Neospintharus)A. morretensis González & Carmen, 1996 (Transferred to Faiditus)A. nasicus (Simon, 1873) (Transferred to Rhomphaea)A. nataliae González & Carmen, 1996 (Transferred to Faiditus)A. nigronodosus Rainbow, 1912 (Transferred to Thwaitesia)A. nigroris Yoshida, Tso & Severinghaus, 2000 (Transferred to Spheropistha)A. nipponicus Kumada, 1990 (Transferred to Neospintharus)A. obscurus Keyserling, 1884 (Transferred to Neospintharus)A. orbitus Zhu, 1998 (Transferred to Spheropistha)A. oris González & Carmen, 1996 (Transferred to Rhomphaea)A. ornatissimus (Dyal, 1935) (Transferred to Rhomphaea)A. pachysomus Chamberlin & Ivie, 1936 (Transferred to Faiditus)A. palmarensis González & Carmen, 1996 (Transferred to Rhomphaea)A. paradoxus Taczanowski, 1873 (Transferred to Rhomphaea)A. parvior Chamberlin & Ivie, 1936 (Transferred to Faiditus)A. parvus (Exline, 1950) (Transferred to Neospintharus)A. patersoniensis (Hickman, 1927) (Transferred to Ariamnes)A. pavesii (Leardi, 1902) (Transferred to Ariamnes)A. peruensis Exline & Levi, 1962 (Transferred to Faiditus)A. pignalitoensis González & Carmen, 1996 (Transferred to Rhomphaea)A. pizai (Soares & Camargo, 1948) (Transferred to Faiditus)A. plaumanni Exline & Levi, 1962 (Transferred to Faiditus)A. pozonae (Schenkel, 1953) (Transferred to Faiditus)A. proboscifer (Exline, 1945) (Transferred to Faiditus)A. pulcher (Soares & Camargo, 1948) (Transferred to Ariamnes)A. pusillus Saaristo, 1978 (Transferred to Argyrodella)A. quasiobtusus Exline & Levi, 1962 (Transferred to Faiditus)A. recurvatus Saaristo, 1978 (Transferred to Rhomphaea)A. remotus (Bryant, 1940) (Transferred to Rhomphaea)A. rhomboides Yin, Peng & Bao, 2004 (Transferred to Spheropistha)A. rigidus Exline & Levi, 1962 (Transferred to Faiditus)A. rioensis Exline & Levi, 1962 (Transferred to Neospintharus)A. rorerae (Exline, 1945) (Transferred to Faiditus)A. rossi Exline & Levi, 1962 (Transferred to Faiditus)A. rostratus (Simon, 1873) (Transferred to Rhomphaea)A. rufopictus (Thorell, 1895) (Transferred to Ariamnes)A. russulus (Simon, 1903) (Transferred to Ariamnes)A. saganus (Dönitz & Strand, 1906) (Transferred to Rhomphaea)A. schlingeri Exline & Levi, 1962 (Transferred to Ariamnes)A. setipes (Hasselt, 1882) (Transferred to Ariamnes)A. sicki Exline & Levi, 1962 (Transferred to Faiditus)A. simoni (Petrunkevitch, 1911) (Transferred to Rhomphaea)A. sinicus Zhu & Song, 1991 (Transferred to Rhomphaea)A. sinuatus (Schenkel, 1953) (Transferred to Ariamnes)A. sjostedti (Tullgren, 1910) (Transferred to Rhomphaea)A. socius Chamberlin & Ivie, 1936 (Transferred to Faiditus)A. solidao Levi, 1967 (Transferred to Faiditus)A. spinicaudatus (Keyserling, 1884) (Transferred to Rhomphaea)A. spinosus (Badcock, 1932) (Transferred to Rhomphaea)A. spinosus Keyserling, 1884 (Transferred to Faiditus)A. striatus Keyserling, 1891 (Transferred to Faiditus)A. subflavus Exline & Levi, 1962 (Transferred to Faiditus)A. sullana (Exline, 1945) (Transferred to Faiditus)A. taeter Exline & Levi, 1962 (Transferred to Faiditus)A. tanikawai (Yoshida, 2001) (Transferred to Rhomphaea)A. triangularis Taczanowski, 1873 (Transferred to Neospintharus)A. triangulatus (Urquhart, 1887) (Transferred to Ariamnes)A. triangulus (Thorell, 1887) (Transferred to Ariamnes)A. trigonum (Hentz, 1850) (Transferred to Neospintharus)A. trituberculatus Becker, 1879 (Transferred to Faiditus)A. ululabilis Keyserling, 1891 (Transferred to Faiditus)A. urquharti (Bryant, 1933) (Transferred to Rhomphaea)A. v-notatus (Petrunkevitch, 1925) (Transferred to Faiditus)A. vadoensis González & Carmen, 1996 (Transferred to Faiditus)A. velhaensis González & Carmen, 1996 (Transferred to Rhomphaea)A. vexus Chamberlin & Ivie, 1936 (Transferred to Faiditus)A. vittatulus (Roewer, 1942) (Transferred to Chrysso)A. woytkowskii Exline & Levi, 1962 (Transferred to Faiditus)A. xiphias Thorell, 1887 (Transferred to Faiditus)A. yacuiensis González & Carmen, 1996 (Transferred to Faiditus)A. yesoensis Saito, 1934 (Transferred to Octonoba)A. yutoensis González & Carmen, 1996 (Transferred to Faiditus)

Nomina dubiaA. meus Strand, 1907A. silvicola'' Saito, 1934

Gallery

See also
 List of Theridiidae species

References

Further reading
 Information, picture, Australian distribution of A. incursus

External links
 Photos of Argyrodes in Portugal

Araneomorphae genera
Cosmopolitan spiders
Theridiidae